was a Japanese kabuki performer.  He was a prominent member of a family of kabuki actors from the Keihanshin region.

Nakamura Utaemon was a stage name with significant cultural and historical connotations.

Life and career

Utaemon IV was believed to be the artistic heir of Nakamura Utaemon III.  In the conservative Kabuki world, stage names are passed from father to son in formal system which converts the kabuki stage name into a mark of accomplishment.

 Lineage of Utaemon stage names
 Nakamura Utaemon I (1714–1791) 
 Nakamura Utaemon II (1752-1798) 
 Nakamura Utaemon III (1778–1838) 
 Nakamura Utaemon IV (1798–1852) 
 Nakamura Utaemon V (1865–1940) 
 Nakamura Utaemon VI (1917–2001) 

In a long career, he acted in many roles including Ishikawa Goemon in the 1838 Edo Nakamura-za production of Sanmon Hitome Senbon.

See also
 Shūmei

References

Bibliography
 Leiter, Samuel L. (2006).  Historical Dictionary of Japanese Traditional Theatre. Lanham, Maryland: Scarecrow Press. ;   OCLC 238637010
 __. ( 2002).  A Kabuki Reader: History and Performance. ; ;  OCLC 182632867
 Nussbaum, Louis Frédéric and Käthe Roth. (2005). Japan Encyclopedia. Cambridge: Harvard University Press. ; OCLC 48943301
 Scott, Adolphe Clarence. (1955). The Kabuki Theatre of Japan. London: Allen & Unwin.  OCLC 622644114

External links

Waseda University, Tsubouchi Memorial Theatre Museum
"Memorial portrait of Nakamura Utaemon [IV] at age 57" by Utagawa Kunisada, at the University of Michigan Museum of Art

Kabuki actors
1798 births
1852 deaths
19th-century Japanese male actors
People from Tokyo
Male actors from Tokyo